The Honduran Association Practical Shooting, Spanish Asociación Hondureña de Tiro Práctico, is the Honduran association for practical shooting under the International Practical Shooting Confederation.

References 

Regions of the International Practical Shooting Confederation
Sports organizations of Honduras